Nicholas Fernandez (born 8 May 1990 in Darlinghurst, New South Wales) is an Australian former competitive figure skater. He is the 2008–09 season Australian national champion and competed at five Four Continents Championships.

Programs

Competitive highlights

References

External links
 

Living people
Figure skaters from Sydney
Australian male single skaters
1990 births